Emma Snerle (born 23 March 2001) is a Danish professional footballer who plays as a midfielder for English Women's Super League club West Ham United FC and the Denmark national team.

Career
Snerle has been capped for the Denmark national team, appearing for the team during the UEFA Women's Euro 2021 qualifying cycle.

On 6 January 2022, it was announced that Snerle had joined FA Women's Super league side West Ham United on a two-and-a-half-year deal.

Career statistics

Club

International 

Scores and results list Denmark's goal tally first, score column indicates score after each Snerle goal.

Honours 
Fortuna Hjørring

 Elitedivisionen: 2017–18, 2019–20
 Kvindepokalen: 2018–19

References

External links
 
 
 

2001 births
Living people
Danish women's footballers
Denmark women's international footballers
Women's association football midfielders
Fortuna Hjørring players
West Ham United F.C. Women players